Caladenia nobilis, commonly known as the noble spider orchid, is a species of orchid endemic to the south-west of Western Australia. It has a single hairy leaf and one or two large white flowers with a red-marked labellum.

Description 
The sepals and petals have long, dark brown, thread-like tips. The sides of the labellum have short, blunt teeth, and the tip is curled under. There are two rows of white, anvil-shaped calli, sometimes with red tips, along the centre of the labellum. Flowering occurs from July to mid-October.

Taxonomy and naming 
Caladenia nobilis was first described in 2001 by Stephen Hopper and Andrew Phillip Brown and the description was published in Nuytsia. The specific epithet (nobilis) is a Latin word meaning "well-known", "celebrated" or "noble" referring to large, attractive flowers of this species.

Distribution and habitat 
The noble spider orchid occurs between Capel and Kalbarri in the Avon Wheatbelt, Geraldton Sandplains, Jarrah Forest and Swan Coastal Plain biogeographic regions where it grows in a wide range of habitats including peppermint and tuart woodland and sandy hills near salt lakes.

Conservation
Caladenia nobilis is classified as "not threatened" by the Western Australian Government Department of Parks and Wildlife.

References 

nobilis
Orchids of Western Australia
Endemic orchids of Australia
Plants described in 2001
Endemic flora of Western Australia
Taxa named by Stephen Hopper
Taxa named by Andrew Phillip Brown